Kaaway ng Batas is a 1990 Philippine action film edited and directed by Pepe Marcos. The film stars Rudy Fernandez. This is the first film produced by Rudy and Lorna Tolentino under their film company Reflection Films.

Cast
 Rudy Fernandez as Lt. Bobby Sandoval
 Howard Aleta as Young Bobby
 Zaldy Zshornack as Col. Cleofas
 Vic Diaz as Don Pedro
 Edu Manzano as Ryan
 Efren Reyes Jr. as Mike
 Star Querubin as Olga
 Ali Sotto as Barbara
 Gabby Concepcion as Rafael Aleta
 Harold Aleta as Young Rafael
 Zandro Zamora as Lt. Mendoza
 Robert Talabis as Jack
 Johnny Vicar as Captain Marcelino
 Mia Gutierrez as Anna
 Katrin Gonzales as Young Anna
 Joey Padilla as Tisoy
 Millet Advincula as Barbara's Friend
 Jim Rosales as Sarge
 Lucita Soriano as Mother
 Rodolfo 'Boy' Garcia as Stepfather
 Ernie Zarate as Doctor
 Dick Israel as Buyer of Dope
 Rene Hawkins as Rapist Slaughter House
 Josie Tagle as Crying Mother in Precinct
 Joe Watts as Police Sargeant Slaugher House
 Vic Felipe as Editor
 Joey Galvez as Attorney
 Nick Nicholson as Club Owner
 Rene Matias as Wounded Officer
 Efren Belardo as Investigating Officer
 Val Iglesias as Hitman Inside Car

Awards

References

External links

1990 films
1990 action films
Filipino-language films
Philippine action films
Films directed by Pepe Marcos